Bhaskar Ghose is a retired Indian, former Secretary, Ministry of Information and Broadcasting 1993–1995, and a former Director General of Doordarshan 1986–1988.

He has long been involved with theatre and has directed and acted in many plays. He anchored the film review show, The Bhaskar Ghose show on Star Movies for four years. He is married to the acclaimed dancer Alarmel Valli and lives in Delhi.

References

Indian civil servants
1938 births
Living people